Edward Austin Kent (February 19, 1854 – April 15, 1912) was a prominent architect in Buffalo, New York.  He died in the sinking of the RMS Titanic and was seen helping women and children into the lifeboats.

Biography
Edward Austin Kent was born in Bangor, Maine on February 19, 1854 to Harriet Ann Farnham (1830–1908) and Henry Mellen Kent (1823–1894). Kent moved with his family to Buffalo after the American Civil War, where his father, Henry, opened a successful department store, Flint & Kent.  He was the brother of William Winthrop Kent (1860–1955), also a prominent architect who studied under H. H. Richardson, and Charles Farnham Kent (1856–1878), who died aged 22 in Denver, Colorado.  Kent attended and graduated from Yale, in 1875, and later the École des Beaux-Arts, the famous Beaux-Arts architecture school in Paris.  Returning to the U.S. in 1877, he became junior partner in the Syracuse, New York firm of Silsbee and Kent.  In 1884, he returned to Buffalo and remained there for the rest of his career, helping to found the Buffalo Society of Architects and receiving many prominent commissions, including Flint & Kent. Until his death, he lived at the Buffalo Club.

In 1912, he took a two-month vacation to France and Egypt and planned on retiring after returning home.

Aboard the Titanic 
Kent traveled as a first-class passenger. He mingled with the other socialites, and with a writers' group which included Helen Churchill Candee and Archibald Gracie. He perished when the ship struck an iceberg and sank on the night of April 14–15, 1912. As the ship was sinking, he disregarded his own safety to help women and children into the lifeboats. He was last seen at around 2:20 a.m. making no attempts to save himself as he was swept into the ocean. His body was recovered by the CS Mackay-Bennett as body No. 258 and claimed by his brother when the ship docked. He was laid to rest in the Forest Lawn Cemetery in Buffalo, New York.

Notable works

 Temple Beth Zion (destroyed) - erected in 1890 at 599 Delaware Avenue in Buffalo, New York. Destroyed on October 4, 1961, when a fire, fueled by flammable liquids being used to refinish the pews, destroyed the building.
 Chemical No. 5 Firehouse - erected in 1894 in the Art Nouveau style at 166 Cleveland Avenue in Buffalo, New York.
 A. E. Perron Company Building - erected in 1895 in the Beaux-Arts style at 674 Main Street as a factory and sales room for the A. E. Perron Company, a manufacturer of early automobiles, sleighs and harnesses.
 Otto-Kent Building - erected in 1896 in the Beaux-Arts style at 636-644 Main Street in Buffalo, New York adjacent to Shea's Buffalo for his father's department store, Flint & Kent
 Unitarian Universalist Church of Buffalo - erected in 1906 in the English Gothic style at 695 Elmwood Avenue in Buffalo, New York and listed on the National Register of Historic Places on June 30, 2015.

See also
Passengers of the RMS Titanic

References

External links 
A trailer for a film about the life of Edward Austin Kent

1854 births
1912 deaths
Deaths on the RMS Titanic
Architects from Bangor, Maine
Architects from Buffalo, New York
Yale University alumni
American alumni of the École des Beaux-Arts
Burials at Forest Lawn Cemetery (Buffalo)